Zak William Brown (born 6 June 2002) is an English professional footballer who plays as a forward for Isthmian League North Division club Felixstowe & Walton United.

Early life
He attended Colneis Junior School in Felixstowe.

Career
After coming through their youth academy, he signed his first professional contract with Ipswich Town in July 2019, with the contract lasting until summer 2021. He joined Leiston on loan in January 2020, and made four appearances for them, scoring one goal. He made his professional debut on 10 November 2020 as a second-half substitute in a 2–0 EFL Trophy defeat away to Crawley Town. In April 2021, Ipswich announced that Brown would be released at the end of the 2020–21 season following the end of his contract.

He signed for Isthmian League North Division side Felixstowe & Walton United in August 2021.

Personal life
He is the younger brother of fellow footballer Charlie Brown.

Career statistics

References

External links

2002 births
Living people
English footballers
Association football forwards
Ipswich Town F.C. players
Leiston F.C. players
Felixstowe & Walton United F.C. players
Southern Football League players